Mamadou Soro Nanga (born 20 April 1993) is an Ivorian footballer who plays for Kuwaiti club Qadsia.

Club career

Youth career
Born and raised in Tioro, Ivory Coast, Mamadou began his footballing career in 2010 at the age of 17 with one of Ivory Coast's renown football schools, Olympic Sport d'Abobo (commonly known as OSA).

Onze Créateurs
Mamadou first moved out of Ivory Coast in 2010 to Mali where he signed a two-year contract with Malian Première Division club, Onze Créateurs de Niaréla. He scored 8 goals in 18 appearances in the 2010–11 Malian Première Division and 12 goals in 24 appearances in the 2011–12 Malian Première Division.

AFAD Djékanou
In October 2012, he moved back to Ivory Coast where he signed a one-year contract Ligue 1 club, Academie de Foot Amadou Diallo, also known as AFAD Djékanou. He scored 10 goals in 18 appearances in the 2012–13 Ligue 1 and helped his side secure the 2nd position in the championship and also helped the Abidjan-based club enter the 2013 CAF Champions League. He made his CAF Champions League debut on 17 February 2013 in a 5–1 win over Sierra Leonean side, Diamond Stars F.C., in a match where Mamdou created history by scoring all the five goals for his side. Later in the First Round of the qualifiers, he was again on target in the second leg in a 2–1 loss against Cameroonian side, Coton Sport FC de Garoua.

RS Berkane
In 2013, he again moved out of Ivory Coast, this time to Morocco, where he signed a one-year contract with Botola club, Nahdat Berkane, also known as RS Berkane. He made his Botola debut on 25 August 2013 in a 1–0 loss against Moghreb Tétouan and scored his first goal on 30 August 2013 in a 1–0 win over Olympic Safi. He scored 3 goals in 25 appearances in the 2013–14 Botola.

Al-Nasr

In 2015, he again moved out of Ivory Coast, this time to Oman, where on 12 September 2015, he signed a one-year contract with Salalah-based, Oman Professional League club, Al-Nasr S.C.S.C. He made his Oman Professional League and scored his first goal on 13 September 2015 in the first game of the 2015–16 Oman Professional League in a 2–1 loss against Al-Suwaiq Club and thus also became the first goal-scorer of the 2015–16 Oman Professional League season.

FC Fredericia
He first moved to Europe in August 2016 to Denmark, where he signed a one-year contract with Danish 1st Division club FC Fredericia. He left the club at the end of the season.

Le Mans
Soro signed a contract with Championnat National 2 side Le Mans in the summer of 2017. He scored the winning goal in their promotion playoff match against Ajaccio earning Le Mans promotion to Ligue 2.

Al-Shoulla
In August 2019, Soro signed a two-year contract with Al-Shoulla of the Prince Mohammad bin Salman League (Saudi second tier).

Al-Bukayriyah
In September 2020, Soro signed a one-year contract with Al-Bukayriyah of the Prince Mohammad bin Salman League (Saudi second tier).

Al-Khaleej
On 23 August 2021, Soro signed a one-year contract with Al-Khaleej of the Prince Mohammad bin Salman League (Saudi second tier).

Qadsia
On 22 June 2022, Soro joined Kuwaiti club Qadsia.

Career statistics

Honours

Club
Al-Nasr S.C.S.C.
Oman Professional League Cup: 2015–16

Al-Khaleej
First Division: 2021–22

References

External links
Mamadou Soro Nanga at Goal.com

Mamadou Soro Nanga - EUROSPORT
Mamadou Soro Nanga - MOUNTAKHAB.net

1993 births
Living people
Ivorian Muslims
Ivorian footballers
People from Savanes District
Ivorian expatriate footballers
Association football forwards
Expatriate footballers in Mali
Ivorian expatriate sportspeople in Mali
Expatriate footballers in Morocco
Ivorian expatriate sportspeople in Morocco
Al-Nasr SC (Salalah) players
FC Fredericia players
Expatriate footballers in Oman
Ivorian expatriate sportspeople in Oman
Expatriate men's footballers in Denmark
Expatriate footballers in Kuwait
Expatriate footballers in Saudi Arabia
Ivorian expatriate sportspeople in Denmark
Ivorian expatriate sportspeople in Kuwait
Ivorian expatriate sportspeople in Saudi Arabia
RS Berkane players
AS Onze Créateurs de Niaréla players
Academie de Foot Amadou Diallo players
Le Mans FC players
Al-Shoulla FC players
Al-Bukayriyah FC players
Khaleej FC players
Qadsia SC players
Championnat National players
Championnat National 2 players
Championnat National 3 players
Saudi First Division League players
Danish 1st Division players
Oman Professional League players
Kuwait Premier League players